is a railway station on the Fujikyuko Line in the city of Tsuru, Yamanashi, Japan, operated by Fuji Kyuko (Fujikyu).

Lines

Station layout

The station is unstaffed, and consists of a single side platform serving a single bidirectional track, with the station structure located on the north side of the track. It has a waiting room but no toilet facilities.

Adjacent stations

History
Tōkaichiba Station opened on 19 June 1929.

Passenger statistics
In fiscal 1998, the station was used by an average of 319 passengers daily.

Surrounding area
 Tahara Falls

See also
 List of railway stations in Japan

References

External links

 Fujikyuko station information 

Railway stations in Yamanashi Prefecture
Railway stations in Japan opened in 1929
Stations of Fuji Kyuko
Tsuru, Yamanashi